Billboard Top Rock'n'Roll Hits: 1965 is a compilation album released by Rhino Records in 1989, featuring 10 hit recordings from 1965.

The album includes seven songs that reached the top of the Billboard Hot 100 chart. The remaining three tracks each reached the Hot 100's Top 5; one of those tracks was the No. 1 song of the year: "Wooly Bully" by Sam the Sham & the Pharaohs.  A 1993 re-issue omitted both tracks by The Byrds as well as "Hang on Sloopy."  These songs were replaced by "I Got You Babe" by Sonny & Cher (a No. 1 hit on the Billboard Hot 100) and two Top 5 hits: "The Name Game" and "A Lover's Concerto." This resulted in what was a Mr. Holland's Opus-esque album, as two songs from the 1993 re-release, "A Lover's Concerto" and "1-2-3", have been featured in the 1996 film Mr. Holland's Opus.

Absent from the track lineup were songs by The Beatles and The Rolling Stones. A disclaimer on the back of the album stated that licensing restrictions made tracks from the two bands unavailable for inclusion on the album.

Track listing

1989 original release

1993 re-release, replacement tracks

1989 compilation albums
Billboard Top Rock'n'Roll Hits albums
Pop rock compilation albums